Des Voeux Island is a member of the Queen Elizabeth Islands and the Arctic Archipelago in the territory of Nunavut. It is an irregularly shaped island located in the Queens Channel, closer to Bathurst Island than to Devon Island.

The island is named in honour of Sir George William Des Vœux, former Governor General of Newfoundland and Labrador and Governor of Hong Kong.

References

External links
 Des Voeux Island in the Atlas of Canada - Toporama; Natural Resources Canada

Islands of the Queen Elizabeth Islands
Uninhabited islands of Qikiqtaaluk Region
Islands of Baffin Bay